The Neades (Νηάδες) were legendary creatures of gigantic size said to inhabit the Greek island of Samos. Their voices were said to be capable of causing earthquakes, and ancient sources report that their bones were put on display by the island's inhabitants.

Ancient Accounts 
The Neades were described by Euphorion in his lost text Commentaries, written in the 3rd century B.C.E., but Aelian, writing in the 2nd century C.E., recounts Euphorion's description of them in his own work titled On the Nature of Animals (De Natura Animalium 17.28).

Plutarch does not write about the Neades specifically, but he does relate another legend of ancient Samos in which earthquakes are caused by the island's ancient inhabitants, whose bones were likewise viewed by his contemporaries (Greek Questions 56).

Possible influence by fossil taxa 

Adrienne Mayor and Nikos Solounias have speculated that the Neades of Aelian's description may have been influenced by the fossilized remains of extinct proboscideans. This speculation is based on the fact that the fossils on Samos are found near a major fault zone, suggesting that ancient Greeks may have interpreted the presence of their skeletal remains as being associated with past seismic activity in the region. Several species of elephant-like animals are represented in the Miocene-age geological deposits on Samos, namely Deinotherium proavum, Choerolophodon pentelici, and Konobelodon atticus.

They suggest also that Panaima as referred to in Plutarch's account, translated as "bloodbath", is a genuine geographic location on the island. They point to a particular bone bed near red sedimentary deposits, suggesting that it was the color of those sediments that inspired the name Panaima. It has also been suggested that the involvement of the Amazons, who were themselves legendary horse-riding warriors, in Plutarch's account of these fossiliferous sites was influenced by the discovery of equid fossils near the same localities, namely those of Hippotherium and Hipparion.

Mayor and Solounias argue that ancient residents of Samos were aware of both the island's fossil record and its geology, and that the stories recounted by Aelian and Plutarch were attempts to make sense of the two. They also cite the discovery of a fossil femur at the Temple of Hera on Samos, suggesting that the bones of the "Neades" were in fact put on display in Antiquity, as attested by Aelian.

References 

Monsters in Greek mythology
Legendary mammals
Greek legendary creatures
Roman legendary creatures
Mythological elephants